"Decimation" is a storyline published by Marvel Comics in 2005, spinning out of the events of the House of M limited series. The event started with a one-shot issue and took place in a number of various series all carrying the "Decimation" logo on the cover. The 2005 miniseries Generation M, Sentinel Squad O*N*E, X-Men: Deadly Genesis and X-Men: The 198 were all launched specifically for the "Decimation" storyline. The various stories were collected in five trade paper backs.

The storyline focuses on the ramifications of the Scarlet Witch stripping nearly all of the mutant population of their powers, thereby reducing a society of millions to one of scant hundreds. This event, which occurred on November 2 according to X-Men (vol. 2) #191, is known as "M-Day" in the Marvel Universe.

Reception among fans and critics was mixed, with a common complaint being the inconsistent manner in which mutants retained their powers while at times depicting "depowered" mutants as still having their physical mutations.

Overview

"Decimation" began with the self-titled one-shot Decimation: House of M: The Day After, and heralded the relaunch of the Excalibur team in New Excalibur, focusing on Pete Wisdom looking for Captain Britain to head up a new British super team, as well as the relaunch of X-Factor from the MadroX miniseries. It also includes several mini-series—Son of M starring a depowered Quicksilver, Generation M focusing on other depowered characters, Sentinel Squad O*N*E showing the latest iteration of the mutant-hunting Sentinels to be robots piloted by humans, X-Men: Deadly Genesis, and X-Men: The 198—and continues throughout the Marvel Universe, particularly in the X-Men-related titles. One consequence is an upswing of anti-mutant sentiment, especially among certain religious groups, who consider M-Day to be God's judgment against mutant-kind.

It has been confirmed through various sources that there are considerably more than 198 mutants remaining—the number has been referred to as "symbolic" rather than actual, and in The 198 Files is said to be the earliest confirmed number. Numbers for pre-Decimation mutants vary from "over a million" (House of M #8) to 14 million (New X-Men #115, where it is said that the 16 million mutants who died on Genosha was around "over half" of the estimated global mutant population of 30 million mutants), giving a population, if the commonly used 90% depowered figure is true, of between one hundred thousand and one and a half million. Based on the mathematical comparisons of the oft-repeated 198 and several million, Marvel re-evaluated the 90% figure into "over 99%", as shown in Civil War: Battle Damage Report when Iron Man comments on the Post-CW world.

Both Hank Pym and Beast note shortly after the event that it is impossible for the energy that certain mutants controlled to simply have vanished, and that it must have been "sent" somewhere. As would later be revealed in New Avengers, most of this energy became a sentient entity called the Collective, who has since come into violent conflict with the Avengers.  In addition, a portion of the energy revived the body of Gabriel Summers, brother of both Alex (Havok) and Scott Summers (Cyclops), who had been trapped in space for many years following the defeat of Krakoa, as depicted in the X-Men: Deadly Genesis limited series.

Mutants affected
According to Marvel Editor-In-Chief Joe Quesada, the "Decimation" event was designed to reduce the number of mutant characters in the Marvel Universe, which he felt had gotten out of hand after forty years of publishing. Most criticisms by fans have been aimed at inconsistencies regarding the roster of mutants who retained their powers after the event. For example, in the Generation M mini-series, several characters were considered depowered, even though they retained their physical mutations. The Civil War Files one-shot revealed that the US government's assessment of the number of mutants on Earth may not be accurate, which allowed Marvel to change the number of depowered mutants. Additionally, characters such as Namor and the Great Lakes Avengers, who are described as mutants but not particularly tied to the X-Men series of books, have not been affected by the event.

Wizard magazine published a speculative list of supposedly decimated characters, which Marvel Comics dismissed as including a number of mutants who still have their powers. While it has been stated that there are at least 198 remaining mutants, according to Henry Peter Gyrich in  Avengers: The Initiative, there are actually "around 300"; the 198 number is merely the number of mutants the US government has cataloged, with a 199th mutant (Mutant Zero) being off the record. Over 198 mutants have already been identified post M-Day, more than 30 of whom have since died.

Necrosha

Selene and her servant Eli Bard have used the Transmode Virus to reanimate the mutant Caliban so that he may track down and reanimate deceased mutants (to both form an army and an energy source for Selene). The reanimated army appeared in the "Necrosha" story arc, consisting of thousands of inhabitants of Genosha, as well a number of notable deceased mutants associated with the X-Men. See the main Necrosha article to view the full list of those resurrected during the story arc.

Necrosha notes:
 The majority of these mutants were used as a sacrifice for Selene to reach her godhood, and have since gone back to being deceased. Those who were not sacrificed likely perished with Selene and the energy she used to keep them alive, as was implied by Destiny at the end of the X-Men: Legacy tie-in.
 Unus and Feral are reanimated but should still be depowered as they were not mutants after M-day. Feral had her feline appearance restored prior to her death, and Unus was temporarily repowered by the Terrigen Mists, resulting in his death.
 Cypher, using his power and assistance from Warlock and Magik, eradicated the techno-organic virus (effectively resurrecting himself).
 Due to his nature, Proteus was able to separate himself from Destiny but was seemingly destroyed in a confrontation with Rogue and Magneto. Magneto doubts if the effects of dispersing Proteus' energy are permanent.

Collected editions

References

External links

 Marvel.com - Official Decimation webpage
 UXN's "Generation M" issue summaries

Genoshan